Talisa Lanoe (born 25 July 1994) is a Kenyan swimmer. She competed in the women's 100 metre backstroke event at the 2016 Summer Olympics. She also competed at the 2015 African Games.

References

External links
 
 Florida Atlantic Owls bio

1994 births
Living people
Kenyan female swimmers
Olympic swimmers of Kenya
Swimmers at the 2016 Summer Olympics
Commonwealth Games competitors for Kenya
Swimmers at the 2010 Commonwealth Games
Swimmers at the 2014 Commonwealth Games
Place of birth missing (living people)
Female backstroke swimmers
Swimmers at the 2015 African Games
African Games competitors for Kenya
Florida Atlantic Owls women's swimmers
Sportspeople from Nairobi